Tormosin is a rural locality (a khutor) in and the administrative center of Tormosinovsky Rural Settlement, Chernyshkovsky District, Volgograd Oblast, Russia. The population was 1,414 as of 2010. There are 12 streets.

Geography 
Tormosin is located 46 km southeast of Chernyshkovsky (the district's administrative centre) by road. Zakharov is the nearest rural locality.

References 

Rural localities in Chernyshkovsky District